Lu Cai (1497–1537) was a Ming Dynasty Chinese playwright. He wrote five chuanqi plays; only Romance of the Bright Pearl, Romance of homesickness and Romance of the Southwest Chamber have survived.

References

1497 births
1537 deaths
Writers from Suzhou
16th-century Chinese dramatists and playwrights